Licauquén River a short river or riachuelo south of Lebu and west of Cañete. It comes from the eastern wooded heights of the Arauco Province to the coast of the Pacific Ocean, it is joined in its upper reaches by a tributary riachuelo named Pilmaiquén and it runs a few kilometers to the southwest to end on the coast at 37° 50' Lat. South, nearby Punta Molguilla (Point Molguilla).

Sources 
  Francisco Solano Asta-Buruaga y Cienfuegos, Diccionario geográfico  de la República de Chile, SEGUNDA EDICIÓN CORREGIDA Y AUMENTADA, NUEVA YORK, D. APPLETON Y COMPAÑÍA. 1899. p. 367

Rivers of Chile
Rivers of Biobío Region